Cole Harbour District High School is a Canadian public high school located in the Forest Hills area of Cole Harbour, Nova Scotia. It is operated by the Halifax Regional Centre for Education (HRCE), and is an International Baccalaureate (IB) world school, offering the Diploma program.

History

Cole Harbour District High School was founded in 1982 by the amalgamation of Cole Harbour High School, founded in 1979, and Gordon Bell High School. The newer building for Cole Harbour High was used as the new location for Cole Harbour District High, and Gordon Bell High was repurposed as the Gordon Bell Building, a general-purpose adult education centre. The Gordon Bell Building served as the Grade 10 building until 1995 when the Cole Harbour District high school was split into two separate schools. Cole Harbour High and Auburn High.  The Bell building was also used as a temporary location for the students of Halifax West High School during the 2001-2002 school year, when its own building was unusable due to health concerns. As of January 2015 the Gorden Bell building has been demolished.

Cole Harbour District High is seen in the hit series Trailer Park Boys. It is used as the location to film the scenes that take place in the fictional Dartmouth Regional Vocational School (DRVS). CHDHS's unofficial rival school is Auburn Drive High School, with whom they play a football game against every Thanksgiving weekend called the Turkey Bowl. In the 2014-2015 school year, renovations were completed on the school adding a new gym and a skilled trades centre while converting the old gymnasium into a cafetorium. The skilled trades centre also includes a yoga studio and a student council office.

Cole Harbour District High School appeared on national news in the late 1980s after a number of riots broke out at the school, alleged to be race-based.  The school was temporarily shut down due to these events.

The school was in the news again in March 2008, when brawls broke out in the school prompting a lockdown.  Two students were arrested, another two sent to hospital.  Though the cause is not completely clear, many think that it resulted in 24 suspensions. Though the brawls only lasted one afternoon, some of the concerns that students and parents had in the 1990s were brought up again. These concerns were again brought up in April, 2009, when another brawl took place after a fire alarm was pulled. One student was sent to the hospital for treatment and several suspensions were handed out. 
In the spring of 2013, Cole Harbour High reappeared on national news following the death of Rehtaeh Parsons, as this was a school that Parsons had previously attended, though she was enrolled at Prince Andrew High School at the time of her suicide. The incident raised questions about the school board's lack of action against bullying. In October 2018, the school was once again in the news after a confrontation between a teacher and a student occurred. The school was in hold and secure and the student was checked by paramedics, but showed no signs of injuries. The teacher was arrested on November 9, 2018.

Programs

Cole Harbour District High School offers an extensive range of courses, categorized as academic, advanced, or open (not required for entrance to university.) Some of which include:
 Biology (11,12)
 Calculus (12)
 Canadian History (11)
 Chemistry (11,12)
 Co-operative Education (10,11,12)
 Construction Technology (10)
 Design (11)
 Drama (10)
 English (10,11,12)
 Family Studies (10)
 Global Geography (12)
 Leadership (12)
 Manufacturing Trades (11)
 Mathematics (10,11,12)
 Mathematics at Work (10,11,12)
 Mathematics Essentials (10,11,12)
 Multimedia (12)
 Oceans (11)
 Pre-Calculus (11,12)
 Pre-IB English (10)
 Pre-IB French (10)
 Pre-IB History (10)
 Pre-IB Mathematics (10)
 Physical Educations (10-12)
 Science (10)
 Skilled Trades (10)

International Baccalaureate Diploma Programme

The International Baccalaureate Diploma Programme has been offered at Cole Harbour District High School since the 2007–2008 school year (with the Diploma Prep program offered starting in 2006–2007), with its first year of graduates in 2009.  Cole Harbour District High School is one of fifteen International Baccalaureate Organization accredited schools in Nova Scotia.

Cole Harbour District High School is considered an open boundary school for students to enroll in the IB Programming. In the spring of a student’s grade 9 year, they can apply to enroll at Cole Harbour District High School as an “out-of-area” student. Starting in Grade 10 these students then attend the pre-IB classes to start their pursuit of the IB Diploma.

Music

Cole Harbour District High School offers several music courses: Music Band 10, 11, 12, and Music Vocal 10, 11, 12.

Physical education

As of the 2008–2009 school year, graduates will be required to have at least one Phys. Ed. credit, from either Physical Education 10, 11, 12, Leadership or Physically Active Living.  Previously, students were required to take Career and Life Management (CLM) 11 and Physically Active Lifestyles (PAL) 11, (both 1/2 credits), but these courses were eliminated in favor of Physically Active Living 11 (1 full credit).  The French equivalent of the CLM/PAL combination (Gestion de carrière et vie/Style de vie actif) is still offered. Current teachers in the physical education department include Reg Bezanson (PE 10–12), Craig Campbell (Leadership & PLV), Patrick Hatfield (PE 10 & PLV) and David Denike (French PAL/CALM).  The school also competes as a Division 1 high school in the metro high school athletic association a division of the Nova Scotia School Athletic Association.

French immersion

Students can choose to study in either the English or French language.  Nova Scotia requires a minimum of nine French credits to receive the French certificate, including a French Language Arts course for each grade level. At Cole Harbour District High School students can receive both French Immersion certification as well an International Baccalaureate Diploma.  Students can currently take a number of different French courses, including Biologie, Histoire canadienne, and Production de film digital et vidéo.

Extracurricular activities

Cole Harbour District High School has many different extracurricular activities for students to participate in.  These include a number of competitive sports teams.

Musical

In 2016 the school put on their first in house musical in the new cafetorium with the show Annie.

The cast, stage managers, and pit band consist of students from all grades in the high school, commonly assisted by graduated high school students in theatre studies.

Previous productions

Youth health centre

The Cavway undertakes a number of projects throughout the year, including a gay-straight alliance, raising money for Christmas Daddies (a local children's charity), tobacco-awareness, and peer-education.

Notable alumni
T. J. Grant - three-time (HS) Wrestling Champion; retired mixed martial artist for the Ultimate Fighting Championship
Robb Wells - of the Trailer Park Boys
John-Paul Tremblay - of the Trailer Park Boys
David Banfield - Former NHL referee
Kevin Deveaux - MLA for Cole Harbour-Eastern Passage (1998-2007) and UN Expert on Parliaments

References

External links

School's website
School profile at Halifax Regional School Board

High schools in Halifax, Nova Scotia
Educational institutions established in 1979
Schools in Halifax, Nova Scotia
International Baccalaureate schools in Nova Scotia
1979 establishments in Nova Scotia